Reinhardt van Rensburg (born 23 March 1992) is a South African middle-distance runner competing primarily in the 800 metres. He represented his country at the 2015 World Championships in Beijing without advancing from the first round. In addition, he won the bronze medal at the 2015 Summer Universiade.

His personal best in the event is 1:45.33 set in Rio de Janeiro at the 2016 Summer Olympics.

Competition record

References

1992 births
Living people
South African male middle-distance runners
Place of birth missing (living people)
World Athletics Championships athletes for South Africa
Athletes (track and field) at the 2016 Summer Olympics
Olympic athletes of South Africa
Competitors at the 2013 Summer Universiade
Competitors at the 2017 Summer Universiade
Medalists at the 2015 Summer Universiade
Universiade bronze medalists for South Africa
Universiade medalists in athletics (track and field)